Gibasis is a genus of flowering plants within the Commelinaceae family, first described in 1837. It is native to the Western Hemisphere from Texas and the West Indies south to Argentina, with most of the species native to Mexico.

It is closely related to the genus Tradescantia and some of the species used to be classified as tradescantias in the past, for instance Gibasis geniculata as Tradescantia geniculata.

Species 
The genus contains the following species:
 Gibasis chihuahuensis (Standl.) Rohweder – Chihuahua, Durango, Michoacán
 Gibasis consobrina D.R.Hunt – Oaxaca, Veracruz
 Gibasis geniculata (Jacq.) Rohweder – from Durango + San Luis Potosí south to Argentina; Wilson County in south-central Texas
 Gibasis gypsophila B.L.Turner – Nuevo León
 Gibasis hintoniorum B.L.Turner – Nuevo León
 Gibasis karwinskyana (Schult. & Schult.f.) Rohweder – Nuevo León, Tamaulipas
 Gibasis linearis (Benth.) Rohweder – Coahuila, Chihuahua
 Gibasis matudae D.R.Hunt ex Stant – Veracruz, Oaxaca
 Gibasis oaxacana D.R.Hunt – Oaxaca
 Gibasis pauciflora (Urb. & Ekman) D.R.Hunt – Cuba, Dominican Republic
 Gibasis pellucida (M.Martens & Galeotti) D.R.Hunt – Central + Southern Mexico, Guatemala, El Salvador, naturalized in Florida + Texas 
 Gibasis pulchella (Kunth) Raf. – Central + Southern Mexico, Colombia
 Gibasis triflora (M.Martens & Galeotti) D.R.Hunt – Guatemala, Jalisco, Guerrero, Oaxaca, Michoacán, Nayarit, Veracruz
 Gibasis venustula (Kunth) D.R.Hunt – Central + Southern Mexico

References

 
Commelinales genera